Plumer is a surname.

Plumer may also refer to:

People
 Viscount Plumer, a British peerage title
 Baron Plumer, a British nobility title

Places
 Plumer Barracks, Plymouth, England, UK; formerly Crownhill Barracks, a former British military barracks
 Plumer Block, Franklin, Venango County, Pennsylvania, USA; an NRHP-listed building that burned down; also called the Hancock Building
 Plumer House, West Newton, Westmoreland County, Pennsylvania, USA; an NRHP-listed building

See also

Hanna v. Plumer (1965), a decision by the Supreme Court of the United States
Taylor v Plumer (1815), an English trusts law case in the UK
 nom de plume, pen-name, pseudonym
 Plume hunting
 Plume (disambiguation)
 Plum (disambiguation)
 
 Plummer (disambiguation)
 Plumber (disambiguation)